John Hodge may refer to:

John R. Hodge (1893–1963), United States Army officer
John E. Hodge (1914–1996), American chemist
John Hodge (politician) (1855–1937), British politician
John Hodge (engineer) (1929–2021), British-born aerospace engineer
John Hodge (screenwriter) (born 1964), British screenwriter
John Hodge (English footballer) (born 1969), English footballer
John Hodge (Scottish footballer), played for Manchester United and Stenhousemuir
John Hodge (police commissioner), colonial police officer in Nigeria
Jack Hodge (1906–1996), English footballer

See also
John Hodges (disambiguation)